A box truck—also known as a box van, cube van, bob truck or cube truck—is a chassis cab truck with an enclosed cuboid-shaped cargo area. On most box trucks, the cabin is separate to the cargo area; however some box trucks have a door between the cabin and the cargo area.

The difference between a box truck and a van is that the cargo van is a one-piece (unibody), while a box truck is created by adding a cargo box to a chassis cab.

North American usage

Box trucks are typically  in length and can range from Class 3 to Class 7 (12,500 lb. to 33,000 lb. gross vehicle weight rating). They often have a garage door-like rear door that rolls up. They are often used by companies transporting home appliances or furniture, or are used as moving trucks which can be rented by individuals.

Ford, Dodge and Chevrolet/GMC have historically been the most common manufacturers of conventional cab/chassis to which the cargo box is attached by various producers (called body builders or upfitters). Isuzu Motors, Mitsubishi Fuso Truck of America, Inc. and UD Trucks have been the most common producers of cab over-type medium duty cab/chassis used as platforms for box trucks.

Small box trucks often use the cab of full size vans from Ford, Chrysler or General Motors (e.g. Ford E-Series/Econoline/Ford Transit, Dodge Ram Van, Chevrolet Express/Chevrolet Van/GMC Vandura/GMC Savana), though pre-manufactured cutaway van chassis vehicles are the basis (rather than an actual cargo van), in order to reduce the labour required for production.

Box van definition in British English 
In British English, box van is a term for a four-wheeled covered goods wagon (freight vehicle) with a fully enclosed body.

In British English the word truck refers to large open topped freight vehicles or rail freight waggons. A lorry is a HGV road vehicle. A van is used for an enclosed railway freight carriage or medium or smaller commercial road vehicles.

Luton body 

A Luton body is a style of commercial vehicle body incorporating an enclosed box body extended over the cab.  It takes its name from the town of Luton, in Bedfordshire, where the Bedford commercial vehicle plant was located.

This style of body was designed to accommodate the high-volume, low-weight loads of straw hats which were part of Luton's industry. Straw hats were wrapped in hessian fabric in long cylinders to fit across the width of the van. It was incidental that it was the home of Bedford although all the early Luton vans were on Bedford chassis.

The body style is common in medium commercial vehicles such as the Ford Transit, as well as larger vehicles, especially those used by household removals companies.  More modern examples may be streamlined to reduce wind resistance.  Some commercial vehicles have a wind deflector on the cab roof, but this is not a Luton body; the Luton is functional and can be accessed from the main body. The portion of the body that rests over the cab is called the peak, also referred to, in some quarters, as a "Luton" or a "kick".

Many commercial vehicles have tilting cabs.  To allow for this, the floor of the Luton may be hinged, and there may be a hinged flap at the front.

See also
Flatbed truck
Step van

References

Trucks by type